is a former Japanese football player.

Playing career
Watanabe was born in Miyagi Prefecture on April 18, 1973. After graduating from Juntendo University, he joined Japan Football League club Brummell Sendai (later Vegalta Sendai) based in his local in 1996. Although he could not play at all in the match until 1997, he played many matches as center back and left side back from 1998. The club was also promoted to J2 League from 1999. However he left the club end of 1999 season.

Club statistics

References

External links

1973 births
Living people
Juntendo University alumni
Association football people from Miyagi Prefecture
Japanese footballers
J2 League players
Japan Football League (1992–1998) players
Vegalta Sendai players
Association football defenders